Palaeorhiza is a genus of bees belonging to the family Apidae.

The species of this genus are found in Australia.

Species:

Palaeorhiza abdominalis 
Palaeorhiza aemula 
Palaeorhiza aenea 
Palaeorhiza affinis 
Palaeorhiza agrias 
Palaeorhiza albopicta 
Palaeorhiza amabilis 
Palaeorhiza amoena 
Palaeorhiza angusta 
Palaeorhiza anthracina 
Palaeorhiza apicata 
Palaeorhiza attractans 
Palaeorhiza bagudai 
Palaeorhiza basilura 
Palaeorhiza bicolor 
Palaeorhiza bicolorata 
Palaeorhiza caerulescens 
Palaeorhiza callima 
Palaeorhiza callimoides 
Palaeorhiza capitata 
Palaeorhiza cassiaefloris 
Palaeorhiza chimbuensis 
Palaeorhiza cockerelli 
Palaeorhiza combinata 
Palaeorhiza concorda 
Palaeorhiza conica 
Palaeorhiza convexa 
Palaeorhiza cuprea 
Palaeorhiza cyanea 
Palaeorhiza cylindrica 
Palaeorhiza decorata 
Palaeorhiza delicata 
Palaeorhiza denticauda 
Palaeorhiza disrupta 
Palaeorhiza distincta 
Palaeorhiza dorsalis 
Palaeorhiza eboracina 
Palaeorhiza elegantissima 
Palaeorhiza enixa 
Palaeorhiza eugenes 
Palaeorhiza eugenoides 
Palaeorhiza eumorpha 
Palaeorhiza excavata 
Palaeorhiza eximia 
Palaeorhiza facialis 
Palaeorhiza falcifera 
Palaeorhiza ferruginea 
Palaeorhiza flavescens 
Palaeorhiza flavipennis 
Palaeorhiza flavipes 
Palaeorhiza flavomellea 
Palaeorhiza formosa 
Palaeorhiza fulva 
Palaeorhiza fulvago 
Palaeorhiza gloriosa 
Palaeorhiza grandis 
Palaeorhiza gressitorum 
Palaeorhiza hedleyi 
Palaeorhiza helena 
Palaeorhiza heterochroa 
Palaeorhiza hilara 
Palaeorhiza imperialis 
Palaeorhiza infuscata 
Palaeorhiza jutefae 
Palaeorhiza kraussi 
Palaeorhiza kurandensis 
Palaeorhiza laevis 
Palaeorhiza latifacies 
Palaeorhiza lieftincki 
Palaeorhiza longiceps 
Palaeorhiza lusoria 
Palaeorhiza luxuriosa 
Palaeorhiza malachisis 
Palaeorhiza maluae 
Palaeorhiza mandibularis 
Palaeorhiza melanosoma 
Palaeorhiza melanura 
Palaeorhiza melina 
Palaeorhiza micheneri 
Palaeorhiza miranda 
Palaeorhiza misoolensis 
Palaeorhiza moluccensis 
Palaeorhiza montana 
Palaeorhiza nana 
Palaeorhiza nasalis 
Palaeorhiza nigra 
Palaeorhiza nigrescens 
Palaeorhiza nitens 
Palaeorhiza odyneroides 
Palaeorhiza papuana 
Palaeorhiza paracylindrica 
Palaeorhiza paradisea 
Palaeorhiza paradoxa 
Palaeorhiza parallela 
Palaeorhiza paris 
Palaeorhiza parva 
Palaeorhiza parvula 
Palaeorhiza pembertoni 
Palaeorhiza perkinsi 
Palaeorhiza permiranda 
Palaeorhiza pernigra 
Palaeorhiza persimilis 
Palaeorhiza perviridis 
Palaeorhiza polita 
Palaeorhiza priamus 
Palaeorhiza pulchella 
Palaeorhiza pullata 
Palaeorhiza punctata 
Palaeorhiza purpurea 
Palaeorhiza purpureocincta 
Palaeorhiza purpureoventris 
Palaeorhiza recessiva 
Palaeorhiza rectituda 
Palaeorhiza reginarum 
Palaeorhiza rejecta 
Palaeorhiza robusta 
Palaeorhiza rubrifrons 
Palaeorhiza rufescens 
Palaeorhiza rugosa 
Palaeorhiza samuelsoni 
Palaeorhiza sanguinea 
Palaeorhiza sculpturalis 
Palaeorhiza sedlaceki 
Palaeorhiza senilis 
Palaeorhiza simillima 
Palaeorhiza simulans 
Palaeorhiza speciosa 
Palaeorhiza spectabilis 
Palaeorhiza stellaris 
Palaeorhiza stygica 
Palaeorhiza subcrassiceps 
Palaeorhiza subhyalina 
Palaeorhiza terrestris 
Palaeorhiza tetraxantha 
Palaeorhiza tricolor 
Palaeorhiza trigona 
Palaeorhiza turneriana 
Palaeorhiza variabilis 
Palaeorhiza varicolor 
Palaeorhiza variegata 
Palaeorhiza violacella 
Palaeorhiza virescens 
Palaeorhiza viridiceps 
Palaeorhiza viridifrons 
Palaeorhiza viridimutans 
Palaeorhiza wisselmerenensis

References

Apidae